Onsbjerg is a village on the island of Samsø in Denmark. It is located in Samsø Municipality

Etymology
The village is named after the nearby hill of Dyret, which was formerly named Odinsbjerg.

History
Onsbjerg Church (also known as Holy Cross Church. Danish: Hellig Kors Kirke) was built in the 1200s.

References

Samsø
Samsø Municipality
Cities and towns in the Central Denmark Region
Villages in Denmark